The Los Angeles Rugby Club, founded in 1958, is a premier First Division amateur rugby team that competes in the Southern California Rugby Football Union (SCRFU) that reports to USA Rugby—the national governing body for the United States Rugby Union.

History 

Competing continuously for over 50 years, The Los Angeles Rugby Club is the second oldest club in the Southern California Rugby Football Union (SCRFU). The Club was founded in 1958 as the Universities Rugby Club. Founding members included Al Williams and Dick Hyland, members of the Gold Medal winning 1924 USA Olympic Rugby Team.

Los Angeles Rugby Club (LARC) has contributed extensively to the development of the game of Rugby Union Football on the Pacific Coast and the USA. Many teams can trace their beginnings to the direct effort of the Los Angeles R.C. or to former members who have relocated and founded clubs in their respective areas.

In 2004, LARC forged an informal partnership with the Manhattan Beach Youth Rugby Club a member of Southern California Youth Rugby an autonomous subset of SCRFU. LARC made this partnership official in 2013 when they merged with the Manhattan Beach Tykes which put 6 youth teams under the LARC umbrella; U8, U10, U12, U14, U16, and U18. LARC also had an informal partnership with Los Angeles Coast Women's Rugby Football Club that began in 2007 but ceased when the Coast team folded in 2011.

LARC continues to wage very heated competition with long-time rivals Santa Monica Rugby Club, Old Mission Beach Athletic Club (OMBAC), and Belmont Shore RFC. In 1984, LARC was the Pacific Coast RFU Territorial Champion and Division 1 National Finalists.  The 2007 road to the National Championship title ended just short bringing home the Div II 3rd place Cup, and a Southern California Championship.  LARC returned to Div 1 in 2008 where they had an enormously successful season defeating OMBAC, Santa Monica, San Mateo and others on their way to the National Playoffs and a Div 1 #12 National Ranking.  LARC met Life RFC in Austin, TX in the National Playoffs, LA came up short to Life RFC who went on to win the 2008 Div 1 National Championship.  In 2009 LARC fell just short of their National Title aspirations again losing in the quarterfinals 7–15 to Aspen RFC who went on to win the 2009 Div 1 National Championships.  LARC finished the 2009 season with a #8 National Ranking.

Notable players 
On the pitch, LARC players have distinguished themselves at the highest levels. Our USA International players include: Barry Williams (Wing); Boyd Morrison (Center); Bill Brown (Hooker); Ray Nelson (Fullback); Steve Gray (Captain & Flyhalf); John Mickel (Scrumhalf); Dave Surdyka (Flanker);Joe Clarkson (Flyhalf); John Jelaco (Prop); Michael Skahan (Wing); Rob Duncanson (Wing); Jamie Grant (Hooker). Ray Nelson, capped 25 times, is the eighth leading scorer in US history.

Other International LARC players are: Doug Rollerson, Gary Cunningham (New Zealand); Ray Mordt (South Africa); Ernesto Ure (Argentina); Paul McNaughton (Ireland), Mick Jackman (Ireland A).

The current USA Rugby Sevens Head Coach, Al Caravelli is a former longtime LARC player. Other notable former LARC players now coaching include: Head Coach Marty Jones and Joe Katoa with LARC.  Barry Williams with The San Pedro Rhinos; Steve Gray at U.C. Davis; Tim Hock & Larry Docimo at Loyola Marymount University.

Past SCRFU Presidents include Paul Ganey, and Jason Scott.

Current notable players include long time LA flanker John Yuhas (Captain '11–'13), Bozho Deranja (Captain '06), front rows Nathanael Heiselt and George Kongakika, the Lock Dream Team (LDT) Mike Gorell and Kevin Kusiak, eight man Tala Gafe, long time LA fly half RJ Smith, inside center Adrian Ojeda, and utility back Chris Sweeny

Tournaments and Tours 
The Club currently hosts the popular Catalina Island Rugby Festival the first weekend in May.  The tournament is administered by Tom Hendrix and LARC Honorary Life Member Joe Hendrix. These tournaments have raised funds for charitable contributions to The Special Olympics, The Wellness Community of the South Bay, and many others.

The Clubs tours and tournament play is an important part of their history. In 1967, LARC was the first mainland club side to tour Hawaii. In 1974 the Club had its first European trip – a two-week, five game tour of France and Belgium. LARC's host was French club Chateaurenard RFC, which in turn LARC hosted in 1975. In September 1977, the club toured Wales and Ireland and played eight matches. A five match tour to New Zealand followed in 1980.

LARC has played host to many quality rugby touring sides visiting the U.S. Pacific Coast. Recent matches have been against teams such as: Club Pueyrredon, St. Andrews F.P. (Argentina); Ponsonby, Kaierau, Paeroa West (New Zealand); Paris University Club, Chateaurenard (France); Old Wesley, Clontarf, Old Crescent (Ireland); Sale, Orrell, Richmond, and Osterley (England). Recently LARC has joined up with the Malibu Rugby Club for a tour each year, trips have included Argentina/Uruguay and Eastern Europe with a South Africa trip planned in Feb/March 2015.

The Ganey Cup was and annual tournament that pitted southern California D1 teams with their Super League rivals.  LARC lost in the Ganey Cup finals in 2008 to Belmont Shore, who went on to place 2nd in the nation in the Super League.  In 2009 LARC placed 2nd again, this time falling short to the Las Vegas Rugby Club who went on to place 2nd in the nation, losing to Aspen in the National Finals.

Sponsors 
 Anheuser Busch
 Sharkeez Manhattan Beach
 West Coast Sports Medicine
 CrossFit South Bay
 Just Chill
 MiniStorage.net

External links 
 LARC Official Site
 Southern California Rugby Football Union
 USA Rugby
 Catalina Island Rugby Festival

References 
 LA Impresses in Ganey Cup –  American Rugby News
 California Leagues Underway –  American Rugby News
 LA Leads in Southern California –  American Rugby News

Rugby Club
Rugby clubs established in 1958
1958 establishments in California